Tashkan may refer to:

 Tashkan, Afghanistan
 Tashkan-e Sadat, Iran
 Teshkan Rural District, in Iran